Oatley Pleasure Grounds is a bush park located in Oatley, New South Wales.

History
A private park was started by Harry Linmark before 1934. A band, weekly on Sunday, previously held entertaining shows at the park. Chinese New Year celebrations and picnics hosted by the Salvation Army were held in the park.
A zoo was constructed in the park which held animals, such as kangaroos, monkeys, snakes and emus. Around the same period a wine bar was also constructed, but it was noisy and received complaints. Later in 1934, Kogarah Council purchased the park, extended it and renamed it.

Features
Oatley Pleasure Grounds has the following features:
The park can be accessed through a designated walking path.
There is a designated swimming area surrounded by a net.
The park extends to a very sandy area when the tide is low.
Views of Oatley Bay and the Georges River.

See also
 Moore Reserve, Oatley
 Oatley Point Reserve
 Parks in Sydney

References

Parks in Sydney
Protected areas established in 1934
1934 establishments in Australia